Lisa Doreen Boyle (born August 6, 1964) is an American actress and model most known for her appearances in Playboy magazine and its various Special Editions. She is also a freelance photographer, shooting content for various publications.

Early life
Boyle was born in Chicago, Illinois. She graduated from Chicago's Steinmetz High School in 1982. After high school, she headed off to Kailua, Hawaii, with a friend and worked as a waitress. A few months later, she returned to Chicago and for a short while before moving to Los Angeles. She ended up getting a job at a Hard Rock Cafe.

Career

Boyle started her acting career in 1988 with a part in Earth Girls Are Easy and had her first starring roles in 1994's Midnight Tease and the women in prison film Caged Heat 3000. She is sometimes credited as Lisa D. Boyle, Lissa Boyle, Lisa Boyles, Cassandra Leigh, or Cassandrea Leigh. She has appeared in several other movies, including cameos in Lost Highway and Face/Off and more substantial roles in direct-to-video softcore movies including Cinemax's I Like to Play Games and Friend of the Family (1995) which helped cement her loyal following. In addition to movies, she has also appeared on TV shows such as Married... with Children (playing Fawn, one of Kelly Bundy's friends, in five episodes), Dream On, Silk Stalkings and The Hughleys. She has also appeared in several music videos, including Aerosmith's "Falling in Love (Is Hard on the Knees)" as well as Warren G's "I Shot the Sheriff".

After she broke up with her boyfriend, Boyle decided to become a nude model. She got an agent and within a month was signed up for Playboy magazine. She was asked to pose for the March/April 1995 edition of The Book of Lingerie. A long list of Books of Lingerie followed, and she appeared in more than 15 editions between 1995 and 2000, five of which were cover shots. In addition to Playboy, Boyle has also posed for Celebrity Skin, L'Equipe magazine, Access magazine and Loaded.

Boyle worked as a booth babe for Eidos Interactive at the 1999 Electronic Entertainment Expo (E3).

She was a still photographer in the TV show Chasing Farrah in 2005.

Filmography
 Earth Girls Are Easy (1988) as Lisa D. Boyle (Curl Up and Dye Dancer)
 Road to Revenge (1993) (as Cassandrea Leigh) as Alex
 Midnight Witness (1993) as Heidi
 Red Shoe Diaries as Dancer (2 episodes, 1992–1994)
 On the Edge (1994) (V) (as Lisa Boyles) as Janine
 Midnight Tease (1994) (as Cassandra Leigh) as Samantha
 Terminal Voyage (1994) as Veiled Woman
 Love Street as Elizabeth (1 episode, 1994)
 Concealed Weapon (1994) as Polish Emigree
 Dream On as Lisa (1 episode, 1994)
 Criminal Hearts (1995) as Claire
 Caged Heat 3000 (1995) (as Cassandra Leigh) as Kira
 Guns and Lipstick (1995) as Dancer
 When the Bullet Hits the Bone (1995) (uncredited) as Desert Girl
 Bad Boys as Girl Decoy
 Friend of the Family (1995) (as Lissa Boyle) as Montana Stillman
 Red Shoe Diaries 5: Weekend Pass (1995) (V) (uncredited) as Dancer (segment "Double or Nothing")
 I Like to Play Games (1995) as Suzanne
 Showgirls (1995) as Sonny
 High Tide (1 episode, 1995)
 Alien Terminator (1995) (as Cassandra Leigh) as Rachel
 Dreammaster: The Erotic Invader (1996) as September
 Daytona Beach (1996) (TV) as Nikki Sanders
 Erotic Confessions as Ursula (1 episode, 1996)
 Married... with Children as Fawn / (5 episodes, 1993–1996)
 Married... with Children as Bubbles Double Dee (1993 epi NO MA'AM)
 Baywatch Nights as Saundra (1 episode, 1996)
 The Nutty Professor (1996) as Sexy Girl
 Silk Stalkings as Mandy Harrison /(2 episodes, 1995–1996)
 Time Hunters (1997) as Una
 The Night That Never Happened (1997) as Roxy
 Lost Highway (1997) as Marian
 Intimate Deception (1997) (V) as Tina
 Face/Off (1997) as Cindee
 Total Security as Brittany (1 episode)
 Leaving Scars (1997) as Diane Carlson
  In Love (Is Hard On The Knees) - Aerosmith music video (1997) as Sexy Girl
 Sheer Passion (1998) as Terri
 Brooklyn South as 1st Female (1 episode, 1998)
 Buddy Faro (1 episode, 1998)
 The Hughleys as Cinnamon (1 episode, 1999)
 Baywatch as Debra Sinclair /(3 episodes, 1994–1999)
 G vs E as Gigi Peaks (1 episode, 1999)
 The Last Marshal (1999) as Sunny
 Let the Devil Wear Black (1999) as Bobo
 The Phantom Eye (1999) TV mini-series .... Bride #1
 Shasta McNasty as Waitress (1 episode, 1999)
 Lucky Numbers (2000) (unconfirmed)
 Pray for Power (2001) (V) as Heather Leighton
 Black Scorpion as Medusa (3 episodes, 2001)

References

External links
 
 
 AskMen.com profile

Female models from Illinois
American film actresses
Living people
Actresses from Chicago
1964 births
Models from Chicago
21st-century American women